Hoani MacDonald (born 21 August 1978) is a former New Zealand rugby union player and current coach. He played provincial rugby for Southland, and for the Highlanders in Super Rugby.

In September 2008, he joined Welsh side the Newport Gwent Dragons in the Celtic League.

MacDonald signed with the Melbourne Rebels for the 2011 Super Rugby season.

On 20 October 2012, MacDonald suffered a cardiac arrest in a match for Southland against Counties Manukau in an ITM Cup semi final. He had CPR performed on the pitch, before being transferred to hospital and placed in an induced coma. MacDonald was in hospital for one week and doctors fitted him with an implantable cardioverter-defibrillator. As a result, he retired from playing rugby.

In 2015, it was announced MacDonald had become the Southland coach for at least the next two seasons. He has been part of the coaching staff since his retirement.

References

External links
Newport Gwent Dragons profile
Junior All Blacks Profile

1978 births
Living people
New Zealand rugby union coaches
New Zealand rugby union players
Dragons RFC players
Rugby union locks
Rugby union flankers
Māori All Blacks players
Melbourne Rebels players
Highlanders (rugby union) players
Southland rugby union players
Expatriate rugby union players in Wales
New Zealand expatriate rugby union players
New Zealand expatriate sportspeople in Wales
Rugby union players from Invercargill
Expatriate rugby union players in Australia